Agrotis edmondsi is a moth of the family Noctuidae. It is found in the Maule, Biobío and Araucanía regions of Chile.

The wingspan is 32–44 mm. Adults are on wing in March.

The larvae feed on various herbaceous plants.

External links
 Noctuinae of Chile

Agrotis
Moths of South America
Moths described in 1882
Endemic fauna of Chile